Crowley County is a county located in the U.S. state of Colorado. As of the 2020 census, the population was 5,922. The county seat is Ordway.

History
Crowley County was created by the Colorado legislature on May 29, 1911, out of the northern portions of Otero County.  Previously both were parts of Bent County.  The county was named for John H. Crowley, senator from Otero County to the state legislature at the time of the split.  Its original inhabitants decades earlier were Native Americans, more Cheyenne than other tribes at the time the western expansion of the U.S. arrived.

The first significant development and settlement occurred in 1887 when the Missouri Pacific Railroad came through from the east, on its way to Pueblo and Colorado's rich gold fields of "Pikes Peak Or Bust".

The county seat is in Ordway, a town established in 1890 that quickly became the economic hub of the area.  Other towns still existing along the Missouri Pacific Railroad's route are Sugar City, Crowley, and Olney Springs.

A few years later, developers brought a canal east from the Arkansas River, with ambitious plans to irrigate a million acres (4000 km2) in Kansas; instead, the canal petered out in Crowley County but did irrigate  along its length.  This turned early Crowley County into a lush agricultural mecca at first.

By the 1970s  almost all the water rights were sold from what is now called the Twin Lakes Canal to the fast-growing cities of Colorado's Front Range corridor.  The area's economic activity has shifted toward ranching.  Much of the land has returned to its original sparse prairie grassland conditions.

The Crowley School, which is now the Crowley County Heritage Center, is the county's only historic site listed on the U.S. National Register of Historic Places.

Crowley County also today hosts a state prison.  The 2000 census showed 5,518 county residents, of which 1,955 were prisoners, giving Crowley County the highest percentage of incarcerated prisoners of any county in the U.S.  The county maintained this position in the 2010 census, with 2,682 prisoners out of 5,823 residents.

Geography
Lake Meredith, which lies south of Ordway and Sugar City, is the largest of several lakes in the county.

Adjacent counties
 Lincoln County - north
 El Paso County - northwest
 Otero County - south
 Kiowa County - east
 Pueblo County - west

Major Highways
  State Highway 71
  State Highway 96
  State Highway 167
  State Highway 207

Bicycle trail
TransAmerica Trail Bicycle Route

Demographics

As of the census of 2000, there were 5,518 people, 1,358 households, and 957 families living in the county.  The population density was 7 people per square mile (3/km2).  There were 1,542 housing units at an average density of 2 per square mile (1/km2).  The racial makeup of the county was 82.95% White, 7.05% Black or African American, 2.59% Native American, 0.82% Asian, 0.02% Pacific Islander, 4.77% from other races, and 1.81% from two or more races.  22.54% of the population were Hispanic or Latino of any race.

There were 1,358 households, out of which 34.50% had children under the age of 18 living with them, 55.10% were married couples living together, 11.00% had a female householder with no husband present, and 29.50% were non-families. 25.70% of all households were made up of individuals, and 13.00% had someone living alone who was 65 years of age or older.  The average household size was 2.59 and the average family size was 3.12.

In the county, the population was spread out, with 18.80% under the age of 18, 9.90% from 18 to 24, 39.60% from 25 to 44, 20.80% from 45 to 64, and 10.80% who were 65 years of age or older.  The median age was 37 years. For every 100 females there were 205.40 males (this is the highest of any U.S. county/parish in 2000).  For every 100 females age 18 and over, there were 240.90 males.

The median income for a household in the county was $26,803, and the median income for a family was $32,162. Males had a median income of $20,813 versus $21,920 for females. The per capita income for the county was $12,836.  About 15.20% of families and 18.50% of the population were below the poverty line, including 23.60% of those under age 18 and 13.50% of those age 65 or over.  More recent data, published in 2011, estimated that 48.1 percent of the county's residents lived in poverty, and of 3,197 counties ranked by the U.S. Census Bureau in 2011 for "estimated percent of people of all ages in poverty", Crowley was second.

Census data for Crowley County includes 1,955 prisoners. The prison population is 19.23% Black, and 24.35% Hispanic. Without the prisoners, Crowley County would be 86.72% White, 0.36% Black, and 21.55% Hispanic. As a percentage of its population, Crowley County has more of its Census population in prison than any other county in the country.

Politics
Crowley is a predominantly Republican county. No Democratic presidential nominee has won Crowley County since Lyndon Johnson's 1964 landslide. Before that time, the county largely followed the patterns of Colorado politics in general, from strongly Democratic during the William Jennings Bryan and Woodrow Wilson eras to Republican leaning from the time of Wendell Willkie onwards.

Communities

Towns
Crowley
Olney Springs
Ordway
Sugar City

See also

Outline of Colorado
Index of Colorado-related articles
Colorado census statistical areas
National Register of Historic Places listings in Crowley County, Colorado
Pike's Peak Gold Rush

References

External links

Crowley County History
Colorado County Evolution by Don Stanwyck
Colorado Historical Society

 

 
Colorado counties
1911 establishments in Colorado
Populated places established in 1911
Eastern Plains